The Federal Reserve Bank of Chicago Detroit Branch Office is the only branch office of the Federal Reserve Bank of Chicago. It is part of the 7th district and its code is 7-G. It is currently located at 1600 East Warren Avenue, near I-75 in Detroit's Eastern Market Historic District. The office occupies  and cost $80 million to build. The Detroit branch was founded in 1927 and is currently headed by Robert Wiley.
Each branch of the Federal Reserve Banks has a board of either seven or five directors, a majority of whom are appointed by the parent Federal Reserve Bank; the others are appointed by the Board of Governors. Branch directors serve staggered three-year terms (two-year terms if the Branch has five directors). One of the members appointed by the Federal Reserve Board is designated annually as chairman of the board of that Branch in a manner prescribed by the parent Federal Reserve Bank.

Current Board of Directors
The following people are on the board of directors as of April 2019:

Appointed by the Federal Reserve Bank

Appointed by the Board of Governors

Historic building

The Federal Reserve Bank of Chicago Detroit Branch Building is a bank building located at 160 W. Fort Street in Detroit, Michigan.
The building was constructed in 1927 in a Classical Revival style.
In 1951, the bank added an eight-story glass-and-marble annex, designed by Minoru Yamasaki. The Modern annex is clearly designed not to mimic the original building, but to make a statement all its own.

In 2004, the Federal Reserve Bank moved to its new building on Warren Avenue, leaving the building on Fort empty. A developer purchased the building with the intention of creating loft space.

In July 2011, Quicken Loans representatives were visiting the building, leading to speculation that Dan Gilbert would purchase the space. Gilbert announced the purchase on January 30, 2012.

In February 2014, the Detroit Media Partnership, parent of the Detroit Free Press and The Detroit News, announced all three organizations would occupy six floors in both the old and new sections of the building.  The partnership anticipated completing the move before September and expected to place a sign on the exterior.

Money Smart Week
The Detroit Branch currently coordinates the annual Michigan Money Smart Week. Coordinated by the Detroit Branch, partner organizations and the Money Smart Advisory Council (MAC), Money Smart Week is designed to promote financial literacy and provide greater personal finance education to consumers. It provides free events which are designed to provide financial education to consumers. The events are overseen by the Money Smart Advisory Council (MAC). The main event is a gathering of several hundred educators at the Detroit Branch office where they receive educational material from various sponsors. Overall, more than 100 sponsors participate in 200 events.

See also

 Federal Reserve Act
 Federal Reserve System
 Federal Reserve Districts
 Federal Reserve Branches
 Federal Reserve Bank of Chicago
 Federal Reserve Bank of Chicago Detroit Branch Building

References

Chicago Detroit Branch
Organizations based in Detroit
Banks based in Michigan
Organizations established in 1927
Economy of Detroit
1927 establishments in Michigan